Werner Griesel (born 1 July 1986) is a South African professional rugby union player, currently playing with the . His regular position is centre and he occasionally plays on the wing.

Career

Youth

Griesel played first team rugby for his high school, Welkom Gymnasium, in 2003 and 2004, earning a call-up to the  side that played at the 2004 Under-18 Craven Week tournament in Potchefstroom.

Griffons

2008 saw Griesel return to Welkom to link up with the  once again.

Free State Cheetahs

Griesel came on as a substitute with twenty minutes to go and scored a try within a minute of coming on with his first touch of the ball, to help the Cheetahs to a 49–39 victory in Bloemfontein.

References

1986 births
Living people
Free State Cheetahs players
Griffons (rugby union) players
Rugby union centres
Rugby union players from Welkom
South African rugby union players